The Symphony No. 4, Op. 17 was the fourth of six symphonies by Russian composer Nikolai Karetnikov. It was composed in 1963 at the age of 33, and premiered in Prague in 1968 during the Prague Spring. It received its Western premiere on 29 March 1994, 7 months before Karetnikov's death, in London's Barbican Hall by the BBC Symphony conducted by Alexander Lazarev. 

One of the most adventurous Soviet symphonic works in the 1960s, it is a bleak single-movement dodecaphonic symphony structured into five continuous sections lasting for c. 25 minutes, and it has been compared with the music of Roberto Gerhard and Roger Sessions. Karetnikov said the symphony was written under the impression of his personal tragedy and the end of Khrushchev Thaw. He spoke of an internal programme derived from Sophocles' tragedy Oedipus Rex.

References

Compositions by Nikolai Karetnikov
Karetnikov
1963 compositions
Twelve-tone compositions